Khirbat al-Jawfa' was a Palestinian Arab village that was depopulated during the 1948 Arab–Israeli war.

Location
It overlooked the Jordan Valley to the north and northeast, and was linked by a dirt path to the village Tall al-Shawk in District of Baysan.

History

British period
In the British mandate period the village was classified  as a hamlet by the Palestine Index Gazetteer.

It was probably occupied by the forces of the Golani Brigade as part of Operation Gideon on 12 May 1948. Most of its population fled to Jenin and its surrounding areas after the Israeli forces overtook the city of Bisan on 15 May 1948.

Israeli period
According to the Palestinian historian Walid Khalidi, the 1948 armistice line separating Israel from the West Bank fell a short distance to the west of Khirbat al-Jawfa, cutting through the land of the nearby village of Faqqu'a (in the West Bank). The land of this village that was inside Israel have been combined with the land that belonged to Khirbat al-Jawfa, making the two indistinguishable. The kibbutz of Ma'ale Gilboa, founded 1962, is located inside this amalgamated parcel of land, southwest of the village site.

Khalidi described the village remaining structures in 1992 as: "Although sections of some walls still stand, most of the former houses have been reduced to rubble. The entire area has been fenced in and is used as a grazing area for cows. A large water tank belonging to kibbutz Ma'ale Gilbo'a is on the site".

See also
 Depopulated Palestinian locations in Israel

References

Bibliography

External links and references
Welcome to  al-Jawfa,-Khirbat
Khirbat al-Jawfa  at  Zochrot
Survey of Western Palestine, Map 9:   IAA, Wikimedia commons
Al-Jawfa, Khirbat  at  Khalil Sakakini Cultural Center
 Khirbat al-Jawfa, from Palestine Family.

Arab villages depopulated during the 1948 Arab–Israeli War
District of Jenin
Former populated places in the State of Palestine
Former populated places in Israel